Elizabeth "Lisl" Close, (née Scheu; 4 June 1912, in Vienna – 29 November 2011, in Minneapolis) was an influential female architect practicing in Minnesota. During her long partnership with her husband, Winston "Win" Close (1906-1997), she designed many notable public buildings and private homes while managing the family firm for extended periods.

Early life
Artists were frequent guests in the home, including Ezra Pound and John Gunther. She became interested in architecture, in which she graduated at the Technische Hochschule in Vienna. Perhaps because she had a Jewish mother, she left Austria in August 1932—before the arrival of the Nazis—sailing aboard the SS American Merchant from London, and arrived in New York on 29 August 1932. She completed her education in Boston with an M.A. in architecture at MIT in 1935.

Career and marriage

While she was studying in Boston, Close met her future husband, Winston Close, who was also a graduate student. It was not easy for women to enter the architecture profession at the time; after being rejected by two firms, she accepted an appointment by the third and started work in Philadelphia, working under architect Oscar Stonorov. In 1936, she joined the firm in Minneapolis where Winston was employed, Magney and Tusler. They established their own firm, Close and Scheu Architects, in 1938, building flat-roofed, streamlined homes.

Winston and Elizabeth Close married in 1938, at which time her professional status was so unusual that the local paper ran an article titled "Architect Weds Architect." Elizabeth kept her maiden name until she became pregnant in 1940, when convention required her to adopt her husband's name. Elizabeth ran the family firm while her husband was away during World War II and from 1950–1971 when he was head architect to the University of Minnesota. Architectural historian Jane King Hession says of Close: "By her example she inspired many women in architecture, myself included, but she didn't want to be known as a woman architect -- just as an architect who happened to be a woman." Close was known for designing buildings that have flat roofs, unpainted redwood or cedar siding, and large windows.

In 2002, Close was awarded the Minnesota Gold Medal, a lifetime achievement award by the American Institute of Architects (AIA); this is the highest honor given to an individual by the local branch.

Death and legacy
Elizabeth Close died on 29 November 2011 at Minneapolis, Minnesota. She was a role model for a generation of women wishing to practice architecture in a male-dominated profession.

In 2020, the University of Minnesota Press published the biography Elizabeth Scheu Close: A Life in Modern Architecture. An accompanying exhibit was on display at the University of Minnesota until the campus was closed during the COVID-19 pandemic.

Selected works 
 1953 Close family home in the University Grove neighborhood (1588 Fulham Street) near the University of Minnesota
Ferguson Hall, the music building on the University of Minnesota's West Bank campus
 Gray Freshwater Biological Institute, on Lake Minnetonka
 1948 Rood House, designed for sculptor John Rood in Minneapolis' Kenwood neighborhood
 Duff house in Wayzata, Minnesota
 Fourteen houses in the University Grove neighborhood near University of Minnesota
 Whiting House, 1950, Owatonna, MN (622 E School St)

References

External links
Close Associates website
 The Residential Architecture of Winston and Elizabeth Close

1912 births
2011 deaths
20th-century American architects
American women architects
Architects from Minneapolis
Architects from Vienna
20th-century American women
21st-century American women
Austrian emigrants to the United States